Company was a collection of free improvising musicians. The concept was devised by guitarist Derek Bailey, in order to create challenging and artistically stimulating combinations of players, who might not otherwise have had an opportunity to work together.

Company included a wide variety of jazz, avant-garde and modern classical musicians during its existence, including Evan Parker, Anthony Braxton, Tristan Honsinger, Misha Mengelberg, Lol Coxhill, Fred Frith, Steve Beresford, Steve Lacy, Lee Konitz, Jamie Muir, Johnny Dyani, Wadada Leo Smith, Han Bennink, Eugene Chadbourne, Henry Kaiser, John Zorn, Buckethead, and Georgie Born. “Company Weeks”, annual week-long free improvisational festivals organised by Bailey, ran from 1977 until 1994.

Discography 
1976: Company 1 - Derek Bailey, Evan Parker, Tristan Honsinger, Maarten van Altena 
1976: Company 2 - Derek Bailey, Anthony Braxton, Evan Parker
1976: Company 3 - Derek Bailey, Han Bennink
1977: Company 4 - Derek Baily, Steve Lacy
1977: Company 5 - Derek Bailey, Leo Smith, Steve Lacy, Evan Parker, Anthony Braxton, Tristan Honsinger, Maarten Altena 
1977: Fictions
1978: Company 6 & 7
1980: Fables
1982: Epiphany / Epiphanis
1983: Trios
1987: Once
1992: Company 91 (three volumes)
2001: Company in Marseille (recorded 1999)

References

External links 

List of Incus CDs (mainly Company or Derek Bailey related)

Free improvisation ensembles
Company (free improvisation group)
Musical groups established in 1968
Incus Records artists